Bert Pearson may refer to:

 Bert Pearson (American football) (1905–1945), American football player
 Birchall Pearson (1914–1960), Canadian athlete